Fodiator is a genus of flying fishes. It is the only genus in the subfamily Fodiatorinae.

Etymology
Fodiator means "one who stab", likely a reference to the long, thin, sharp snout with its projecting lower jaw.

About
Fodiator species live in marine climates, reaching a maximum length of 19 cm. They can most easily be found in Baja California, Mexico, the Gulf of California to Peru, and the Clipperton and Galapagos Islands. They rise to the surface of the water when the water becomes warm. They even have the ability to leap out of the water and glide in the air for long distances. To reproduce, these fish attach their eggs to small floating objects. Two species are found in the Pacific Ocean, with one also being found in the eastern Atlantic.

Species
Two species in this genus are recognized:
Fodiator acutus (Valenciennes, 1847) (sharpchin flyingfish)
Fodiator rostratus (Günther, 1866)

References

 
Exocoetidae
Taxa named by David Starr Jordan